Yaoki Ishii (born 29 April 1977) is a Japanese former professional tennis player.

A right-handed player from Kamagaya, Ishii won the singles title at the 1998 All Japan Tennis Championships and won a further two national championships in doubles.

Ishii reached a career high ranking of 207 in the world while competing on the professional tour and featured in the qualifying draws of all four grand slam tournaments.

In 2000 and 2001 he was a member of the Japan Davis Cup team, winning three of his five singles rubbers.

See also
List of Japan Davis Cup team representatives

References

External links
 
 
 

1977 births
Living people
Japanese male tennis players
People from Kamagaya
Sportspeople from Chiba Prefecture
20th-century Japanese people
21st-century Japanese people